Obalokun was an Alaafin of Oyo, he was first in an era of successive despotic and short-lived kings of Oyo.

Life
Obalokun Agana Erin was born to the daughter of the Alake of Egbaland.

According to Oyo tales, he was in communication with the King of either France or Portugal. 

He was succeeded by Ajagbo.

References

Samuel Johnson, Obadiah Johnson. The History of the Yorubas, From the Earliest of Times to the Beginning of the British Protectorate. p. 168.

Alaafins of Oyo